A list of animated feature films released in the 1960s.

References

1960s
1960s animated films
Animated